The Monomoiria are the 360 individual degrees of the sky in Hellenistic astrology.  They were each associated with particular planets, especially in traditions that influenced and were influenced by Paulus Alexandrinus's Eisagogika and Vettius Valens's Anthology.

References

External links
Almagest Ephemeris Calculator, which also calculates monomoiria.
Table of Monomoiria by Golden Hind Press

Hellenistic astrology
Technical factors of Western astrology